The Naila Art Gallery is an art gallery in Riyadh, Saudi Arabia.

History
The gallery was opened in 2012.

Activities
The gallery regularly hosts various educational programs such as lectures, seminars and workshops.

See also
 Culture of Saudi Arabia

References

2012 establishments in Saudi Arabia
Museums established in 2012
Art museums and galleries in Saudi Arabia
Museums in Riyadh